The Heavy Tank T29 was an American heavy tank project started in March 1944 to counter the appearance of the German Tiger II heavy tank. The T29 was not ready in time for the war in Europe, but it did provide post-war engineers with opportunities for applying engineering concepts to artillery and automotive components.

Development 
The T29 was based upon a lengthened version of the T26E3 chassis and featured heavier armor, an upgraded Ford GAC engine producing 750 hp at 2,800rpm, which gave it a power-to-weight ratio of 11.68 hp/t,  more comfortable controls for the driver, and a massive new turret incorporating the high-velocity 105 mm gun T5, which was later replaced by a more powerful 105 mm T5E1.

The tank weighed approximately  unloaded and  combat loaded. The turret had a turret rotation of 18 degrees per second, taking 20 seconds for a whole 360 degree traverse, and the gun had gun angles of 20°+/-10°.

The tank would have carried a total of 63 rounds, with 46 in ammo racks, the ammo weighing 2.2 tons total. Two coaxial 12.7mm machine guns were also mounted in the mantlet. A ball mounted 7.62mm machine gun was carried in the right side of the hull, and a AA 12.7mm machine gun was planned to be mounted on a pintle stem atop the roof. Other trial models had Allison V1710 V12 engines.

The tank was also capable of pivoting on the spot. Suspension consisted of 8 double road wheels with rubber tires, 7 return roller on each side, and had the drive sprockets in the rear. Interestingly, the tank had a crew of six, two acting as a loader for the gun. The T29 featured a coincidence rangefinder projecting from both sides of the turret, distinctively resembling "ears".

The procurement of 1,200 T29s was proposed on 1 March 1945, and revised to 1,152 on 12 April 1945, but by shortly after the end of World War II, only one T29 had been produced, with a second partially completed. In August 1945, the order was cancelled entirely, and it was intended to procure ten T29s for postwar testing. This number was later reduced to eight in July 1947.

Developed at the same time and closely related to the T29, the T30 Heavy Tank was virtually identical, but was mounted with the 155 mm gun T7, featured a more powerful engine, and had an additional crew member to help load the heavy ammunition for the gun. Two vehicles were produced.

The final variation of the T29 concept, the T34 Heavy Tank, mounted a 120 mm gun based upon the contemporary 120mm M1 anti-aircraft gun to further increase the armor penetration capability of the T29.

Surviving tanks

There are several surviving T29s at Fort Benning, Georgia. They are being stored in preparation for an Armor exhibit. One has the distinctive rangefinder, while the other does not. Both can be seen as well as many other vehicles in a fenced enclosure on 25 Infantry Regiment Road. One is located in front of the National Armor and Cavalry Museum.

See also

 List of U.S. military vehicles by model number
 Military technology and equipment

Tanks of comparable role, performance and era
 M6A2E1 heavy tank - Prototype used for testing T29's armament system
 T32 Heavy Tank - Prototype with a similar design; uses a 90 mm cannon
 T30 Heavy Tank - Identical to the T29, but using a 155 mm cannon
 T34 Heavy Tank - A modernized T30 using a 120 mm cannon
 IS-3 heavy tank - Contemporary Soviet assault tank
 IS-4 heavy tank - Contemporary Soviet heavy tank
 Caernarvon Mark II - British heavy tank
 AMX-50 heavy tank - Prototype French heavy tank series

References

External links

 FSU tanks website
 Detail photos of T29 at the Patton Tank Museum

Heavy tanks of the United States
World War II heavy tanks
World War II tanks of the United States
Abandoned military projects of the United States
History of the tank
Trial and research tanks of the United States